Grevillea crithmifolia is a species of flowering plant in the family Proteaceae and is endemic to the south-west of Western Australia. It is a dense shrub with linear leaves, divided leaves with narrowly oblong lobes, or both, and clusters of pale pink to creamy-white flowers.

Description

Taxonomy
Grevillea crithmifolia was first formally described in 1830 by Robert Brown in the Supplementum primum prodromi florae Novae Hollandiae from specimens collected by Charles Fraser in 1827 in the Swan River Colony. The specific epithet (crithmifolia) means "Crithmum-leaved".

Distribution and habitat
Grevillea crithmifolia usually grows in near-coastal woodland or scrub between Wanneroo and Yalgorup National Park with a disjunct population near Dongara in the Swan Coastal Plain biogeographic region of south-western Western Australia.

Conservation status
This grevillea is listed as "not threatened" by the Department of Biodiversity, Conservation and Attractions.

References

crithmifolia
Eudicots of Western Australia
Proteales of Australia
Taxa named by Robert Brown (botanist, born 1773)
Plants described in 1830